Kentfield, California is a place in California.

Kentfield may also refer to:

 Richard Kentfield (1862–1904), English cricketer
 Graham Kentfield (born 1940), chief cashier of the Bank of England